Donald A. Robesky (May 15, 1906 – February 25, 2002) was an American football guard who played college football at Stanford University. He played high school football at Kern Union High School in Bakersfield, California. He was a consensus All-American in 1928. Stanford guard Seraphim Post was also a consensus All-American in 1928. He was a three-year letterman from 1926 to 1928. Robesky played in the 1927 and 1928 Rose Bowls. He was the line coach at Bakersfield College from 1934 to 1942. He was in the United States Navy from 1943 to 1945, earning the rank of Lieutenant commander. He was elected to the Stanford Athletic Hall of Fame in 1958 and the Bob Elias Kern County Hall of Fame on February 16, 1967.

References

External links

1906 births
2002 deaths
Players of American football from Iowa
American football guards
Stanford Cardinal football players
All-American college football players
United States Navy officers
Players of American football from Bakersfield, California